Khijuri is a village situated in Rewari district, India. It lies next to the 750 acre reserve forest and Peacock & Chinkara Breeding Centre, Jhabuwa.

Demographics
As of 2011 India census, Khijuri had a population of 1679 in 312 households. Males (868) constitute 52.14%  of the population and females (811) 47.85%. Khijuri has an average literacy rate of 66.83%, lower than the national average of 74%: male literacy is 58.4%, and female literacy is 41.59% of total literates (1230). In Khijuri, 14.11% of the population is under 6 years of age.

References 

Villages in Rewari district